Zambia is scheduled to participate at the 2018 Summer Youth Olympics in Buenos Aires, Argentina from 6 October to 18 October 2018.

Athletics

Equestrian

Zambia qualified a rider based on its ranking in the FEI World Jumping Challenge Rankings.

 Individual Jumping - 1 athlete

Field hockey
Field hockey at the 2018 Summer Youth Olympics – Boys' Tournament

Preliminary round

Final round

Quarterfinals

Semifinals

Bronze medal game

Judo

Swimming

References

2018 in Zambian sport
Nations at the 2018 Summer Youth Olympics
Zambia at the Youth Olympics